Western Storm are a women's cricket team representing South West England and Wales, one of eight regional hubs in English domestic cricket. They play their home matches at the County Ground, Taunton, the County Ground, Bristol and Sophia Gardens. They are captained by Sophie Luff and coached by Trevor Griffin. The team is partnered with Somerset, Gloucestershire, Glamorgan, Devon, Cornwall, Wiltshire and Cricket Wales. Originally formed to compete in the Women's Cricket Super League in 2016, Western Storm won the competition twice, in 2017 and 2019. When women's cricket in England was reformed in 2020, the Western Storm brand was retained, and they now compete in the Rachael Heyhoe Flint Trophy and the Charlotte Edwards Cup.

History

2016–2019: Women's Cricket Super League

Western Storm were formed in 2016 to compete in the new Women's Cricket Super League, representing the South West. In their inaugural season, they came second in the group stage, meaning they progressed to the semi-final, which they won against Loughborough Lightning. However, they lost in the final by seven wickets to the Southern Vipers. One of Western Storm's overseas players, Stafanie Taylor, was both the leading run-scorer and leading wicket-taker, and was subsequently named player of the tournament.

In 2017, Western Storm finished third in the group stage, again progressing to the semi-final, which they won against the Surrey Stars. In a rematch against the Southern Vipers, this time the Storm emerged victorious, winning by seven wickets and claiming their first WCSL title. Western Storm overseas player Rachel Priest scored 72 in the final, and was the tournament's leading run-scorer. In 2018, Western Storm again reached finals day, finishing third in the group stage, but were defeated by the Surrey Stars in the semi-final. Storm's Smriti Mandhana was the leading run-scorer and player of the tournament.

In the final season of the WCSL, 2019, Western Storm won 9 out of their 10 group stage games, topping the group and progressing straight to the final for the first time. There, they faced Southern Vipers in a repeat of the first ever WCSL final. Chasing 173 to win, Storm captain Heather Knight scored 78* as her side were victorious with an over to spare. Western Storm therefore ended the WCSL as the most successful team, with two title wins. Bowler Freya Davies was the leading wicket-taker in the tournament.

2020– : Domestic Regional Hub

In 2020, women's cricket in England was restructured, creating eight new 'regional hub' teams, with the intention of playing both 50-over and 20-over cricket. The Western Storm brand was retained after this restructuring, with some differences to the squad and coaching staff. Sophie Luff was named as captain of the side, whilst Mark O'Leary became the coach. Due to the COVID-19 pandemic, the 2020 season was truncated, and only 50-over cricket was played, in the Rachael Heyhoe Flint Trophy. Western Storm won 4 of their 6 games, finishing second in the South Group and therefore failing to progress to the final. At the end of the season, six Storm players were given full-time domestic contracts, the first of their kind in England: Sophie Luff, Danielle Gibson, Fi Morris, Georgia Hennessy, Nat Wraith and Alex Griffiths.

The following season, 2021, Western Storm competed in both the Rachael Heyhoe Flint Trophy and the newly-formed Twenty20 competition, the Charlotte Edwards Cup. In the Rachael Heyhoe Flint Trophy the side finished sixth out of eight teams, winning three of their seven matches, including a one-wicket victory in their opening match against North West Thunder. Storm captain Sophie Luff was the leading run-scorer across the whole tournament with 417 runs, including 157* made in the final match against Sunrisers. In the Charlotte Edwards Cup, Storm narrowly missed out on qualifying for Finals Day on Net Run Rate, finishing second in Group B with four wins from their six matches. Storm bowler Nicole Harvey was the fourth-highest wicket-taker in the tournament, with 12 wickets at an average of 9.41.

Ahead of the 2022 season, it was announced that O'Leary was stepping down from his role as Head Coach. Dan Helesfay was appointed as interim Head Coach for the Charlotte Edwards Cup campaign, with Trevor Griffin, who had coached the side between 2017 and 2019, returning to the club to take the role on a permanent basis ahead of the Rachael Heyhoe Flint Trophy. The side finished third in their group in the Charlotte Edwards Cup, with three wins from their six matches. They finished fourth in the group of eight in the Rachael Heyhoe Flint Trophy, winning three of their matches.

Home grounds

Players

Current squad
As per 2022 season.
 No. denotes the player's squad number, as worn on the back of their shirt.
  denotes players with international caps.

Academy
The Western Storm Academy team plays against other regional academies in friendly and festival matches across various formats. The Academy selects players from across the South West and Wales regions, and includes some players who are also in the first team squad. Players in the 2022/23 Academy are listed below:

Overseas Players
  Lizelle Lee – South Africa (2016)
  Stafanie Taylor – West Indies (2016–2018)
  Rachel Priest – New Zealand (2016–2019)
  Holly Huddleston – New Zealand (2017)
  Smriti Mandhana – India (2018–2019)
  Deepti Sharma – India (2019)

Coaching staff

 Head coach: Trevor Griffin
 Regional Director: Lisa Pagett
 Assistant coach: Dave Roberts
 Lead physiotherapist: Jessie Meaney
 Performance analyst: Andy Payne
 Strength & Conditioning Coach: Jack Bennett
 Team Operations Executive: Georgina Clark

As of the 2022 season.

Seasons

Women's Cricket Super League

Rachael Heyhoe Flint Trophy

Charlotte Edwards Cup

Statistics

Women's Cricket Super League

 Abandoned matches are counted as NR (no result)
 Win or loss by super over or boundary count are counted as tied.

Rachael Heyhoe Flint Trophy

 Abandoned matches are counted as NR (no result)
 Win or loss by super over or boundary count are counted as tied.

Charlotte Edwards Cup

 Abandoned matches are counted as NR (no result)
 Win or loss by super over or boundary count are counted as tied.

Records

Women's Cricket Super League 

Highest team total: 185/4, v Lancashire Thunder on 9 August 2018.
Lowest team total: 70, v Southern Vipers on 10 August 2017.
Highest individual score: 106*, Rachel Priest v Yorkshire Diamonds on 20 August 2017.
Best individual bowling analysis: 5/23, Anya Shrubsole v Yorkshire Diamonds on 14 August 2016.
Most runs: 1062 in 36 matches, Heather Knight.
Most wickets: 37 wickets in 36 matches, Freya Davies.

Rachael Heyhoe Flint Trophy 
Highest team total: 313/4, v Sunrisers on 18 September 2021.
Lowest (completed) team total: 177 v Southern Vipers on 12 June 2021.
Highest individual score: 157*, Sophie Luff v Sunrisers on 18 September 2021.
Best individual bowling analysis: 5/26, Fi Morris v Sunrisers on 5 September 2020.
Most runs: 1,024 runs in 19 matches, Sophie Luff.
Most wickets: 20 wickets in 15 matches, Georgia Hennessy.

Charlotte Edwards Cup
Highest team total: 169/5, v Sunrisers on 29 May 2022.
Lowest (completed) team total: 106/9 v Northern Diamonds on 10 July 2021.
Highest individual score: 78, Sophie Luff v Sunrisers on 29 May 2022.
Best individual bowling analysis: 3/13, Nicole Harvey v North West Thunder on 25 August 2021.
Most runs: 285 runs in 12 matches, Sophie Luff.
Most wickets: 13 wickets in 12 matches, Danielle Gibson.

Honours
 Women's Cricket Super League:
 Champions (2) – 2017, 2019

See also
 Devon Women cricket team
 Dorset Women cricket team
 Somerset Women cricket team
 Gloucestershire Women cricket team
 Wales national women's cricket team
 Wiltshire Women cricket team

References

 
Women's Cricket Super League teams
2016 establishments in England
Cricket in Somerset
Somerset County Cricket Club
Cricket in Bristol
Cricket in Gloucestershire
Gloucestershire County Cricket Club
Glamorgan County Cricket Club
Cricket clubs established in 2016
English Domestic Women's Cricket Regional Hub teams